Hyposmocoma canella is a species of moth of the family Cosmopterigidae. It is endemic to the Hawaiian islands of Kauai, Oahu, Molokai and Hawaii.

The larvae probably feed on lichens. The larvae are case-makers and have been found on rocks.

External links

canella
Endemic moths of Hawaii
Moths described in 1907
Taxa named by Thomas de Grey, 6th Baron Walsingham